The Thoroughbred Retirement Foundation (TRF) is an American organization founded in 1982, whose mission is: "To save Thoroughbred horses no longer able to compete on the racetrack from possible neglect, abuse and slaughter."

History
Two years after its founding, the TRF had its first retiree. His name was Promised Road, he was then 9, an undistinguished campaigner whose career ended with a sixth-place finish in a $3,500 claiming race. There have been hundreds more like him who have come under the care of the TRF.  Ron "Gibby" Gibson the trainer of Promised Road went on to teach at the facility before retiring.

Early in the TRF's history, founder and chairman of the board, Monique S. Koehler, negotiated an agreement with the State of New York Department of Correctional Services. In exchange for land use and labor at the state's Wallkill Correctional Facility, the TRF would design, staff and maintain a vocational training program in equine care and management for inmates.

Upon the completion of their sentences, many former inmates who have worked with the horses have gone on to become productive, solid citizens and have been quick to give credit to the TRF program. The inmates cannot have committed a sexual crime or first-degree murder.  This unique prison program has been replicated at TRF farms located at the Blackburn Correctional Facility in Kentucky, Central Maryland Correctional Facility in Sykesville MD, Putnamville Correctional Facility in IN, Vandalia Correctional Facility in IL, Wateree River Correctional Institution in SC, James River Work Center in VA, and Plymouth County Sheriff's Farm in MA.

The horses at these farms and several of TRF's other facilities are often so infirm when retired from racing that they cannot continue in another career. However, hundreds of TRF horses have been trained for second careers, as show jumpers, companion horses, handicapped riding horses, even polo horses.

The foundation says that the "sad truth is that a vast majority of the general public and even many racing fans are unaware of the sad fate that awaits thousands of Thoroughbreds each year. They assume each animal is assured a safe and graceful retirement once its racing days are over. Their perception of the "Sport of Kings" is one where great personal wealth and lifelong benevolence to all horses are givens. Unfortunately, it is a perception that does not reflect reality."

In 2001, the estate of the prominent horse owner and breeder Paul Mellon created a $5 million endowment for the Thoroughbred Retirement Foundation for use in its efforts to rescue and rehabilitate retired race horses. The slaughterhouse killings of famous horses such as the U.S. Hall of Fame horse Exceller and the Kentucky Derby and Breeders' Cup Classic winner Ferdinand both occurred outside the United States but helped raise awareness of what can happen to thoroughbreds, even champions. The TRF also reminds people that the "reality is a Thoroughbred industry made up largely of owners with only modest resources and current economics that dictate that among all owners, no matter how responsible and well-intended, only a relatively few are capable of maintaining even a single Thoroughbred once it is unable to earn its keep on the track."

The TRF is a 501(c)(3) nonprofit tax-exempt organization entirely dependent on public contributions. Income is derived from donations from horse racing fans, owners, breeders, trainers and racing officials who believe racehorses deserve better than a trip to the slaughterhouse when their track careers are over.

Legal troubles

On March 18, 2011, a New York Times article reported that the Thoroughbred Retirement Foundation "...has been so slow or delinquent in paying for the upkeep of the more than 1,000 horses under its care that scores have wound up starved and neglected, some fatally, according to interviews and inspection reports."

In November 2013, the Thoroughbred Retirement Foundation settled a lawsuit with the attorney general of New York State that alleged the foundation mistreated animals in its herd. The settlement noted TRF denied any wrongdoing.

See also
 Old Friends, Inc.
 The Horse Trust
 Living Legends horse retirement home

External links
 Official website of the TRF

References

Animal charities based in the United States
Organizations established in 1982
Horse racing organizations in the United States
Equestrian organizations
Charities based in New York (state)
1982 establishments in the United States